Simplicia is a genus of litter moths of the family Erebidae. The genus was erected by Achille Guenée in 1854.

Description
Its palpi are sickle shaped, with the second joint reaching above the vertex of the head. Third joint long and naked. Antennae minutely ciliated in male. Thorax and abdomen smoothly scaled. Fore tibia of male covered by a sheath containing masses of flocculent (wooly) scales. Forewings with somewhat acute apex. Areole very narrow with vein 10 given off far beyond it in male and from it in female. The discocellulars almost obsolete. Hindwings with vein 5 from near lower angle of cell.

Species

References

Herminiinae
Moth genera